The RAF 2 was a British air-cooled, nine-cylinder radial engine developed for aircraft use just prior to World War I; it was designed and built by the Royal Aircraft Factory.

Applications
Royal Aircraft Factory B.E.8

Specifications (RAF 2)

See also

References

Notes

Bibliography

 Gunston, Bill. World Encyclopaedia of Aero Engines. Cambridge, England. Patrick Stephens Limited, 1989. 
 Lumsden, Alec. British Piston Engines and their Aircraft. Marlborough, Wiltshire: Airlife Publishing, 2003. .

Aircraft air-cooled radial piston engines
1910s aircraft piston engines